Desmia incomposita is a moth in the family Crambidae. It was described by George Thomas Bethune-Baker in 1909. It is found in the Democratic Republic of the Congo (Orientale, Equateur) and Nigeria.

The larvae feed on Antiaris africana.

References

Moths described in 1909
Desmia
Moths of Africa